Callanish is a village (township) on the west side of the Isle of Lewis, in the Outer Hebrides (Western Isles), Scotland. Callanish is within the parish of Uig. Callanish is situated alongside the A858, between Breasclete and Garynahine.

The Callanish Stones "Callanish I", a cross-shaped setting of standing stones erected around 3000 BC, are one of the most spectacular megalithic monuments in Scotland. A modern visitor centre provides information about the main circle and other lesser monuments nearby, numbered as Callanish II to X.

References

External links

 Calanais Visitor Centre
 Breasclete Community Association (local area's website)
 Panoramas of the Callanish Standing Stones (QuickTime required) 
 Canmore - Lewis, Callanish site record
 Canmore - Calanais, Calanais and Bhreascleit War Memorial site record
 Canmore - Lewis, Callanish, Tea Rooms site record
 Canmore - Lewis, Callanish, Pier site record

 A Statistical Analysis of Megalithic Sites in Britain : Alexander Thom
 Alexander Thom

Villages in the Isle of Lewis